Baliwan may refer to:

 Baliwan, Henan, town in Kaifeng, Henan, China
 Baliwan, town in Hong'an County, Hubei, China